Beaufort County may refer to:

In Australia
 Beaufort County, Western Australia

in the United States
 Beaufort County, North Carolina 
 Beaufort County, South Carolina